Dumini is a surname. Notable people with the surname include:

Adolfo Dumini (1863–?), Italian painter
Amerigo Dumini (1894–1967), American-born Italian Fascist hitman